BAHL may refer to:

Bank Al Habib, a Pakistani bank run by Dawood Habib family group of companies
Balkan Amateur Hockey League, a Bulgarian ice hockey league